The 1948 Balkan Cup, officially called the Balkan and Central European Championship, was played between April and November 1948 between Albania, Romania, Bulgaria, Yugoslavia, Hungary, Poland and Czechoslovakia. It was Poland and Czechoslovakia's first and only participation in the tournament, which was not completed. Hungary was leading the table at the time it was abandoned.

Final standings

Matches 

This match between Hungary and Czechoslovakia also counted for the 1948–53 Central European International Cup.

Matches not played 

(note: it is uncertain which teams were meant to at home and which away)

  v. 
  v. 
  v. 
  v. 
  v. 

Aside from these, Hungary played Romania twice.

Statistics

Goalscorers

References 

1948
1948–49 in European football
1947–48 in European football
1948–49 in Romanian football
1947–48 in Romanian football
1948–49 in Bulgarian football
1947–48 in Bulgarian football
1948–49 in Yugoslav football
1947–48 in Yugoslav football
1948–49 in Hungarian football
1947–48 in Hungarian football
1948–49 in Czechoslovak football
1947–48 in Czechoslovak football
1948 in Polish football
1948 in Albanian football